Abortion in the United States and its territories is a divisive issue in American politics and culture wars, with widely different  abortion laws in U.S. states. Since 1976, the Republican Party has generally sought to restrict abortion access based on the stage of pregnancy or to criminalize abortion, whereas the Democratic Party has generally defended access to abortion and has made contraception easier to obtain. The abortion-rights movement advocates for patient choice and bodily autonomy, while the anti-abortion movement maintains the fetus has a right to live. Historically framed as a debate between the pro-choice and pro-life labels, most Americans agree with some positions of each side. Support for abortion gradually increased in the U.S. beginning in the early 1970s, and stabilized during the 2010s.

The abortion rate has continuously declined from a peak in 1980 of 30 per 1,000 women of childbearing age (15–44) to 11.3 by 2018. In 2018, 78% of abortions were performed at 9 weeks or less gestation, and 92% of abortions were performed at 13 weeks or less gestation. By 2020, medication abortions accounted for more than 50% of all abortions. Almost 25% of women will have had an abortion by age 45, with 20% of 30 year olds having had one. In 2019, 60% of women who had abortions were already mothers, and 50% already had two or more children. Increased access to birth control has been statistically linked to reductions in the abortion rate.

Before the Supreme Court of the United States decisions of Roe v. Wade and Doe v. Bolton had decriminalized abortion nationwide in 1973, abortion was already legal in several states; the decision in the former case imposed a federally mandated uniform framework for state legislation on the subject. It also established a minimal period during which abortion is legal, with more or fewer restrictions throughout the pregnancy. That basic framework, modified in Planned Parenthood v. Casey (1992), remained nominally in place, although the effective availability of abortion varied significantly from state to state, as many counties had no abortion providers. Casey held that a law could not place legal restrictions imposing an undue burden for "the purpose or effect of placing a substantial obstacle in the path of a woman seeking an abortion of a nonviable fetus". In December 2021, the FDA legalized telemedicine provision of medication abortion pills with delivery by mail, but many states have laws which restrict this option.

In 2022, Roe and Casey were overturned in Dobbs v. Jackson Women's Health Organization, ending protection of abortion rights by the United States Constitution and allowing individual states to regulate any aspect of abortion not preempted by federal law.

Other states have implicit rights to abortion subject to state judicial review, such as Kansas and Montana, or simply protect it via state law such as Colorado. The state constitutions of Alabama, Louisiana, Tennessee, and West Virginia explicitly contain no right to an abortion.

Terminology

The abortion debate most commonly relates to the "induced abortion" of a pregnancy, which is also how the term is used in a legal sense. Some also use the term "elective abortion", which is used in relation to a claim to an unrestricted right of a woman to an abortion, whether or not she chooses to have one. The term elective abortion or voluntary abortion describes the interruption of pregnancy before viability at the request of the woman but not for medical reasons.

In medical parlance, "abortion" can refer to either miscarriage or abortion until the fetus is viable. After viability, doctors call an abortion a "termination of pregnancy".

History

Early history and rise of anti-abortion legislation
Abortion has existed in North America since the European colonization of the Americas, was a fairly common practice, and was not always illegal or controversial. In the early 1800s, methods were published for accomplishing abortion early in pregnancy. By common law, abortion was legal, and only after quickening it was not allowed; quickening indicated the start of fetal movements, usually felt 14–26 weeks after conception, or between the fourth and sixth month. Its determination was generally at the discretion of the pregnant woman, but the rules were unstated or unclear in written statues. When the United States became independent, most U.S. states continued to apply English common law to abortion. According to legal scholar Sheldon Gelman, the right to bodily integrity including abortion can be traced back to the Magna Carta (1215), which was imported in the U.S. Constitution from English law. William Blackstone's Commentaries on the Laws of England (1765) stated that life "begins in contemplation of law as soon as an infant is able to stir in the mother's womb." This view was shared by James Wilson. As for legal penalties, Blackstone wrote they applied only "if a woman is quick with child, and by a potion, or otherwise, killeth it in her womb."

Within the context of a sex scandal, Connecticut was the first state to regulate abortion in 1821; it outlawed abortion after quickening and forbade the use of poisons to induce one post-quickening. In 1829, New York made post-quickening abortions a felony and pre-quickening abortions a misdemeanor. This was followed by 10 of the 26 states creating similar restrictions within the next few decades, in particular by the 1860s and 1870s. The first laws related to abortion were made to protect women from real or perceived risks, and those more restrictive penalized only the provider. According to several legal scholars, some of the early anti-abortion laws punished not only the doctor or abortionist but also the woman who hired them, and while women could be criminally tried for a self-induced abortion, they were rarely prosecuted in general; dating back to Edward Coke in 1648, whether abortion was performed before or after quickening determined if it was a crime. By 1859, abortion was not a crime in 21 out of 33 states, and was prohibited only post-quickening, while penalties for pre-quickening abortions were lower. This changed starting in the 1860s under the influence of anti-immigrant and anti-Catholic sentiment.

A number of other factors likely played a role in the rise of anti-abortion laws. As in Europe, abortion techniques advanced starting in the 17th century, and the conservatism of most in the medical profession with regards to sexual matters prevented the wide expansion of abortion techniques. Physicians, who were the leading advocates of abortion criminalization laws, appear to have been motivated at least in part by advances in medical knowledge. Science had discovered that fertilization inaugurated a more or less continuous process of development, which produced a new human being. Quickening was found to be not more or less crucial in the process of gestation than any other step. Many physicians concluded that if society considered it unjustifiable to terminate pregnancy after the fetus had quickened, and if quickening was a relatively unimportant step in the gestation process, then it was just as wrong to terminate a pregnancy before quickening as after quickening. Ideologically, the Hippocratic Oath and the medical mentality of that age to defend the sanctity of life as an absolute played a significant role in molding opinions about abortion. Doctors were also influenced by practical reasons to advocate anti-abortion laws. For one, abortion providers tended to be untrained and not members of medical societies. In an age where the leading doctors in the nation were attempting to standardize the medical profession, these unlicensed were considered a nuisance to public health. The more formalized medical profession disliked the unlicensed because they were competition, often at a cheaper cost, and many of them were women.

Despite campaigns to end the practice of abortion, abortifacient advertising was highly effective and abortion was commonly practiced, with the help of a midwife or other women, in the mid-19th century, although they were not always safe. While the precise abortion rate was not known, James Mohr's 1978 book Abortion in America documented multiple recorded estimates by 19th-century physicians, which suggested that between around 15% and 35% of all pregnancies ended in abortion during that period. This era also saw a marked shift in the people who were obtaining abortions. Before the start of the 19th century, most abortions were sought by unmarried women, who had become pregnant out of wedlock and for which there was much less compassion compared to married women who got an abortion; many of them were wealthy and paid well. Out of 54 abortion cases published in American medical journals between 1839 and 1880, over half were sought by married women, and well over 60% of the married women already had at least one child.

The sense that married women were now frequently obtaining abortions worried many conservative physicians, who were almost exclusively men. In the Reconstruction era, much of the blame was placed on the burgeoning women's rights movement. Though the medical profession expressed hostility toward feminism, many feminists of the era were also opposed to abortion. In The Revolution, a newspaper operated by Elizabeth Cady Stanton and Susan B. Anthony, an 1869 opinion piece was published arguing that instead of merely attempting to pass a law against abortion, the root cause must also be addressed. The writer stated that simply passing an anti-abortion law would be "only mowing off the top of the noxious weed, while the root remains. ... No matter what the motive, love of ease, or a desire to save from suffering the unborn innocent, the woman is awfully guilty who commits the deed. It will burden her conscience in life, it will burden her soul in death; But oh! thrice guilty is he who drove her to the desperation which impelled her to the crime." To many feminists of this era, abortion was regarded as an undesirable necessity forced upon women by thoughtless men. The free love wing of the feminist movement refused to advocate for abortion and treated the practice as an example of the hideous extremes to which modern marriage was driving women. Marital rape and the seduction of unmarried women were societal ills, which feminists believed caused the need to abort, as men did not respect women's right to abstinence. Feminist opposition to abortion was much less prevalent by the 20th century, and it was feminists and physicians who came to question anti-abortion laws and raise public interest in the 1960s.

Physicians, one of the most famous and consequential being Horatio Storer, remained the loudest voice in the anti-abortion debate, and they carried their agenda to state legislatures around the country, advocating not only anti-abortion laws but also laws against birth control on racist and pseudoscientific grounds; religious groups were not particularly active within this movement, which presaged the modern debate over women's body rights. Though many of these laws indicated the woman as a co-criminal, she was rarely prosecuted. A campaign was launched against the movement and the use and availability of contraceptives. Criminalization of abortion accelerated from the late 1860s through the efforts of concerned legislators, doctors, and the American Medical Association influenced by Storer, and were facilitated by the press. In 1873, Anthony Comstock created the New York Society for the Suppression of Vice, an institution dedicated to supervising the morality of the public. Later that year, Comstock successfully influenced the United States Congress to pass the Comstock Law, which made it illegal to deliver through the U.S. mail any "obscene, lewd, or lascivious" material. It also prohibited producing or publishing information pertaining to the procurement of abortion, birth control, and venereal disease, including to medical students. The production, publication, importation, and distribution of such materials was suppressed under the Comstock Law as being obscene, and similar prohibitions were passed by 24 of the 37 states.

In 1900, abortion was normally a felony in every state. Some states included provisions allowing for abortion in limited circumstances, generally to protect the woman's health or to terminate pregnancies arising from rape or incest. Most Americans did not abortion as a crime, and abortions continued to occur and became increasingly available. The American Birth Control League was founded by Margaret Sanger in 1921; it would become Planned Parenthood Federation of America in 1942. By the 1930s, licensed physicians performed an estimated 800,000 abortions a year.

Sherri Finkbine 

In the early 1960s, a controversy centered around children's television host Sherri Finkbine that helped bring abortion and abortion law more directly into the American public eye. Living in the area of Phoenix, Arizona, Finkbine had had four healthy children; during her pregnancy with her fifth child, she discovered the child might have severe deformities when born. This was likely because Finkbine had been taking sleeping pills that she was unaware contained thalidomide, a drug that increases the risk of fetal deformities during pregnancy. Though Finkbine wanted an abortion, the abortion laws of Arizona only allowed abortions if a pregnancy posed a threat to the woman's life. The situation gained public attention after Finkbine shared the story with a reporter from The Arizona Republic, who disclosed her identity in spite of her requests for anonymity. On August 18, 1962, Finkbine traveled to Sweden to obtain a legal abortion, where it was confirmed that the fetus had severe deformities.

Finkbine's story marked a turning point for women's reproductive rights and abortion law in the United States. Still, Finkbine was only able to get an abortion because she could afford to travel overseas for it, highlighting an inequality in abortion rights persisting to this day whereby many women cannot afford or otherwise do not have the resources to obtain a legal abortion; in such cases, women may turn to illegal abortion.

Pre-Roe precedents
In 1964, Gerri Santoro of Connecticut died trying to obtain an illegal abortion, and her photo became the symbol of an abortion-rights movement. Some women's rights activist groups developed their own skills to provide abortions to women who could not obtain them elsewhere. As an example, in Chicago, a group known as "Jane" operated a floating abortion clinic throughout much of the 1960s. Women seeking the procedure would call a designated number and be given instructions on how to find "Jane".

In 1965, the U.S. Supreme Court case Griswold v. Connecticut struck down one of the remaining contraception Comstock laws in Connecticut and Massachusetts. However, Griswold only applied to marital relationships, allowing married couples to buy and use contraceptives without government restriction. It took until 1972, with Eisenstadt v. Baird, to extend the precedent of Griswold to unmarried persons as well. Following the Griswold case, the American College of Obstetricians and Gynecologists (ACOG) issued a medical bulletin accepting a recommendation from six years earlier that clarified that "conception is the implantation of a fertilized ovum", and consequently birth control methods that prevented implantation became classified as contraceptives, not abortifacients.

In 1967, Colorado became the first state to decriminalize abortion in cases of rape, incest, or in which pregnancy would lead to permanent physical disability of the woman. Similar laws were passed in California, Oregon, and North Carolina. In 1970, Hawaii became the first state to legalize abortions on the request of the woman, and New York repealed its 1830 law and allowed abortions up to the 24th week of pregnancy. Similar laws were soon passed in Alaska and Washington. In 1970, Washington held a referendum on legalizing early pregnancy abortions, becoming the first state to legalize abortion through a vote of the people. A law in Washington, D.C., which allowed abortion to protect the life or health of the woman, was challenged in the Supreme Court in 1971 in United States v. Vuitch. The court upheld the law, deeming that "health" meant "psychological and physical well-being", essentially allowing abortion in Washington, D.C. By the end of 1972, 13 states had a law similar to that of Colorado, while Mississippi allowed abortion in cases of rape or incest only and Alabama and Massachusetts allowed abortions only in cases where the woman's physical health was endangered. In order to obtain abortions during this period, women would often travel from a state where abortion was illegal to one where it was legal. The legal position prior to Roe v. Wade was that abortion was illegal in 30 states and legal under certain circumstances in 20 states.

In the late 1960s, a number of organizations were formed to mobilize opinion both against and for the legalization of abortion. In 1966, the National Conference of Catholic Bishops assigned Monsignor James T. McHugh to document efforts to reform abortion laws, and anti-abortion groups began forming in various states in 1967. In 1968, McHugh led an advisory group which became the National Right to Life Committee. The forerunner of the NARAL Pro-Choice America was formed in 1969 to oppose restrictions on abortion and expand access to abortion. Following Roe v. Wade, in late 1973, NARAL became the National Abortion Rights Action League.

Roe v. Wade

Prior to Roe v. Wade, 30 states prohibited abortion without exception, 16 states banned abortion except in certain special circumstances (e.g. rape, incest, and health threat to mother), 3 states allowed residents to obtain abortions, and New York allowed abortions generally. Early that year, on January 22, 1973, the U.S. Supreme Court in Roe v. Wade invalidated all of these laws, and set guidelines for the availability of abortion. The decision returned abortion to its liberalized pre-1820 status. Roe established that the right of privacy of a woman to obtain an abortion "must be considered against important state interests in regulation". Roe also established a trimester framework, defined as the end of the first pregnancy trimester (12 weeks), as the threshold for state interest, such that states were prohibited from banning abortion in the first trimester but allowed to impose increasing restrictions or outright bans later in pregnancy.

In deciding Roe v. Wade, the Court ruled that a Texas statute forbidding abortion except when necessary to save the life of the mother was unconstitutional. The Court arrived at its decision by concluding that the issue of abortion and abortion rights falls under the right of privacy in the United States (e.g. federal constitutionally-protected right), in the sense of the right of a person not to be encroached by the state. In its opinion, it listed several landmark cases where the court had previously found a right to privacy implied by the Constitution. The Court did not recognize a right to abortion in all cases, saying: "State regulation protective of fetal life after viability thus has both logical and biological justifications. If the State is interested in protecting fetal life after viability, it may go so far as to proscribe abortion during that period, except when it is necessary to preserve the life or health of the mother."

The Court held that a right to privacy existed and included the right to have an abortion. The court found that a mother had a right to abortion until viability, a point to be determined by the abortion doctor. After viability a woman can obtain an abortion for health reasons, which the Court defined broadly to include psychological well-being. A central issue in the Roe case and in the wider abortion debate in general is whether human life or personhood begins at conception, birth, or at some point in between. The Court declined to make an attempt at resolving this issue, writing: "We need not resolve the difficult question of when life begins. When those trained in the respective disciplines of medicine, philosophy, and theology are unable to arrive at any consensus, the judiciary, at this point in the development of man's knowledge, is not in a position to speculate as to the answer." Instead, it chose to point out that historically, under English and American common law and statutes, "the unborn have never been recognized ... as persons in the whole sense", and thus the fetuses are not legally entitled to the protection afforded by the right to life specifically enumerated in the Fourteenth Amendment. Rather than asserting that human life begins at any specific point, the Court declared that the state has a "compelling interest" in protecting "potential life" at the point of viability.

Doe v. Bolton

Under Roe v. Wade, state governments may not prohibit late terminations of pregnancy when "necessary to preserve the life or health of the mother", even if it would cause the demise of a viable fetus. This rule was clarified by the 1973 judicial decision Doe v. Bolton, which specifies "that the medical judgment may be exercised in the light of all factors—physical, emotional, psychological, familial, and the woman's age—relevant to the well-being of the patient". It is by this provision for the mother's mental health that women in the U.S. legally choose abortion after viability when screenings reveal abnormalities that do not cause a baby to die shortly after birth.

Later judicial decisions
In the 1992 case of Planned Parenthood v. Casey, the Court abandoned Roe's strict trimester framework but maintained its central holding that women have a right to choose to have an abortion before viability. Roe had held that statutes regulating abortion must be subject to "strict scrutiny"—the traditional Supreme Court test for impositions upon fundamental Constitutional rights. Casey instead adopted the lower, undue burden standard for evaluating state abortion restrictions, but re-emphasized the right to abortion as grounded in the general sense of liberty and privacy protected under the constitution: "Constitutional protection of the woman's decision to terminate her pregnancy derives from the Due Process Clause of the Fourteenth Amendment to the United States Constitution. It declares that no state shall "deprive any person of life, liberty, or property, without due process of law." The controlling word in the cases before us is 'liberty'."

The Supreme Court continues to make decisions on this subject. On April 18, 2007, it issued a ruling in the case of Gonzales v. Carhart, involving a federal law entitled the Partial-Birth Abortion Ban Act of 2003 which President George W. Bush had signed into law. The law banned intact dilation and extraction, which opponents of abortion rights referred to as "partial-birth abortion", and stipulated that anyone breaking the law would get a prison sentence up to 2.5 years. The United States Supreme Court upheld the 2003 ban by a narrow majority of 5–4, marking the first time the Court has allowed a ban on any type of abortion since 1973. The opinion, which came from justice Anthony Kennedy, was joined by Justices Antonin Scalia, Clarence Thomas, and the two recent appointees, Samuel Alito and Chief Justice John Roberts.

In the case of Whole Woman's Health v. Hellerstedt, the Supreme Court in a 5–3 decision on June 27, 2016, swept away forms of state restrictions on the way abortion clinics can function. The Texas legislature enacted in 2013 restrictions on the delivery of abortions services that, it was argued by its opponents, created an undue burden for women seeking an abortion by requiring abortion doctors to have difficult-to-obtain "admitting privileges" at a local hospital and by requiring clinics to have costly hospital-grade facilities. The Court supported this argument and struck down these two provisions "facially" from the law at issue—that is, the very words of the provisions were invalid, no matter how they might be applied in any practical situation. According to the Supreme Court, the task of judging whether a law puts an unconstitutional burden on a woman's right to abortion belongs with the courts, and not the legislatures.

The Supreme Court ruled similarly in June Medical Services, LLC v. Russo on June 29, 2020, in a 5–4 decision that a Louisiana state law, modeled after the Texas law at the center of Whole Woman's Health, was unconstitutional. Like Texas' law,  the Louisiana law required certain measures for abortion clinics that, if having gone into effect, would have closed five of the six clinics in the state. The case in Louisiana was put on hold pending the result of Whole Woman's Health, and was retried based on the Supreme Court's decision. While the District Court ruled the law unconstitutional, the Fifth Circuit found that unlike the Texas law, the burden of the Louisiana law passed the tests outlined in Whole Woman's Health, and thus the law was constitutional. The Supreme Court issued an order to suspend enforcement of the law pending further review, and agreed to hear the case in full in October 2019. It was the first abortion-related case to be heard by President Donald Trump's appointees to the Court, Neil Gorsuch and Brett Kavanaugh. The Supreme Court found the Louisiana law unconstitutional for the same reasons as the Texas one, reversing the Fifth Circuit. The judgment was supported by Chief Justice John Roberts who had dissented on Whole Woman's Health but joined in judgment as to upholding the court's respect for the past judgment in that case.

Dobbs v. Jackson Women's Health Organization

 
The Supreme Court granted certiorari to Dobbs v. Jackson Women's Health Organization in May 2021, a case that challenges the impact of Roe v. Wade in blocking enforcement of a 2018 Mississippi law (the Gestational Age Act) that had banned any abortions after the first 15 weeks. Oral arguments to Dobbs were held in December 2021, and a decision was expected by the end of the 2021–22 Supreme Court term. On September 1, 2021, Texas passed the Texas Heartbeat Act, one of the most restrictive abortion laws in the nation, banning most procedures after six weeks. On May 2, 2022, a leaked draft majority opinion for Dobbs, written by Samuel Alito, set to overturn Roe was reported by Politico.

On June 24, 2022, the Supreme Court overruled both Roe and Planned Parenthood v. Casey in the Dobbs case on originalist grounds that a right to abortion cannot be found in the U.S. Constitution. John Roberts, the Chief Justice of the United States, concurred in the decision to uphold the law at question as constitutional, by a 6–3 vote, and did not support overrulling both Roe and Casey. This enabled trigger laws, which had been passed in 13 states, to effectively ban abortions in those states.

Abortion-related initiatives were placed on the 2022 ballot in at least six states, the most ever in a single year. California, Michigan, and Vermont's would enshrine the right to an abortion in their respective state constitutions, while Kansas, Kentucky, and Montana's would place restrictions on abortion. During the August primaries, nearly 60 percent of Kansas voters rejected their state's "Value Them Both Amendment", which would have removed the right to an abortion from the Kansas Constitution.

Travel to Mexico

In the wake of state abortion bans and restrictions in the United States, Americans have started traveling to Mexico for abortions, and Mexico has expressed a willingness to help.

At least partly due to a unanimous 2021 Supreme Court of Justice of the Nation decision that penalties for abortion violate women's rights, abortion-providers are not prosecuted even in states where abortion remains illegal under state law; there are also legal exemptions for rape and medical reasons, and a police report is not required for a rape exemption. Providers openly treat American travelers in several states where abortion remains technically illegal, such as Nuevo Leon, which neighbors Texas. Following the Supreme Court ruling, abortion is being gradually legalized at the state level, and as of 2022 is legal during the first trimester (before the 13th week after implantation) in nine states and Mexico City. In an additional two states, abortion is legal for economic reasons if a woman already has 3 children; this is during the first trimester for one (Michoacan) and with no set limit for the other (Yucatán).

Legal status

Federal legislation
Since 1995, led by congressional Republicans, the U.S. House of Representatives and U.S. Senate have moved several times to pass measures banning the procedure of intact dilation and extraction, commonly known as partial birth abortion. Such measures passed twice by wide margins, but President Bill Clinton vetoed those bills in April 1996 and October 1997 on the grounds that they did not include health exceptions. Congressional supporters of the bill argue that a health exception would render the bill unenforceable, since the Doe v. Bolton decision defined "health" in vague terms, justifying any motive for obtaining an abortion. Congress was unsuccessful with subsequent attempts to override the vetoes.

The Born-Alive Infants Protection Act (BAIPA) was enacted August 5, 2002, by an Act of Congress and signed into law by George W. Bush. It asserts the human rights of infants born after a failed attempt to induce abortion. A "born-alive infant" is specified as a "person, human being, child, individual". "Born alive" is defined as the complete expulsion of an infant at any stage of development that has a heartbeat, pulsation of the umbilical cord, breath, or voluntary muscle movement, no matter if the umbilical cord has been cut or if the expulsion of the infant was natural, induced labor, cesarean section, or induced abortion. The Born-Alive Abortion Survivors Protection Act is a proposed piece of legislation that would result in criminal penalties for any practitioner who denies a born-alive infant care.

On October 2, 2003, with a vote of 281–142, the House approved the Partial-Birth Abortion Ban Act to ban intact dilation and extraction, with an exemption in cases of fatal threats to the woman. Through this legislation, a doctor could face up to two years in prison and civil lawsuits for performing such a procedure. A woman undergoing the procedure could not be prosecuted under the measure. On October 21, 2003, the United States Senate passed the bill by a vote of 64–34, with a number of Democrats joining in support. The bill was signed by President George W. Bush on November 5, 2003, but a federal judge blocked its enforcement in several states just a few hours after it became public law. The Supreme Court upheld the nationwide ban on the procedure in the case Gonzales v. Carhart on April 18, 2007, signaling a substantial change in the Court's approach to abortion law. The 5–4 ruling said the Partial Birth Abortion Ban Act does not conflict with previous decisions regarding abortion.

The judicial interpretation of the U.S. Constitution regarding abortion, following the Supreme Court of the United States's 1973 landmark decision in Roe v. Wade, and subsequent companion decisions, is that abortion is legal but may be restricted by the states to varying degrees. States have passed laws to restrict late-term abortions, require parental notification for minors, and mandate the disclosure of abortion risk information to patients prior to the procedure.

The official report of the U.S. Senate Judiciary Committee, issued in 1983 after extensive hearings on the Human Life Amendment (proposed by Senators Orrin Hatch and Thomas Eagleton), stated: "Thus, the [Judiciary] Committee observes that no significant legal barriers of any kind whatsoever exist today in the United States for a mother to obtain an abortion for any reason during any stage of her pregnancy."

One aspect of the legal abortion regime now in place has been determining when the fetus is "viable" outside the womb as a measure of when the "life" of the fetus is its own (and therefore subject to being protected by the state). In the majority opinion delivered by the court in Roe v. Wade, viability was defined as "potentially able to live outside the mother's womb, albeit with artificial aid. Viability is usually placed at about seven months (28 weeks) but may occur earlier, even at 24 weeks". When the court ruled in 1973, the then-current medical technology suggested that viability could occur as early as 24 weeks. Advances over the past three decades allow survival of some babies born at 22 weeks.

, the youngest child to survive a premature birth in the United States was a girl born at Kapiolani Medical Center in Honolulu, Hawaii, at 21 weeks and 3 days gestation. Because of the split between federal and state law, legal access to abortion continues to vary by state. Geographic availability varies dramatically, with 87 percent of U.S. counties having no abortion provider. Moreover, due to the Hyde Amendment, many Medicaid state programs do not cover abortions; as of 2022, 17 states including California, Illinois, and New York offer or require such coverage.

The legality of abortion is frequently a major issue in nomination battles for the U.S. Supreme Court. Nominees typically remain silent on the issue during their hearings, as the issue may come before them as judges.

The Unborn Victims of Violence Act, commonly known as Laci and Conner's Law, was passed by Congress and signed into law by President Bush on April 1, 2004, allowing two charges to be filed against someone who kills a pregnant mother (one for the mother and one for the fetus). It specifically bans charges against the mother and/or doctor relating to abortion procedures. Nevertheless, it has generated much controversy among pro-abortion rights advocates who view it as a potential step in the direction of banning abortion.

In 2021, the Women's Health Protection Act, which would codify abortion rights into federal law, was introduced by Judy Chu. The bill passed the U.S. House of Representatives but was rejected by the U.S. Senate.

After the Dobbs decision, Merrick Garland, the U.S. Attorney General, asserted that under federal law, states do not have the right to restrict access to FDA-approved abortion pills, but Louisiana passed a law to ban mailing them.
Legal experts cited as a potentially persuasive precedent the 2014 district decision in Zogenix v. Patrick, in which the court ruled that under the doctrine of federal preemption, Massachusetts could not ban the opioid Zohydro because it had been approved by the FDA.

On September 13, 2022, Republican senator Lindsey Graham introduced legislation that would ban abortion nationwide after 15 weeks of pregnancy with exceptions for rape, incest, and the life of the patient, named the Protecting Pain-Capable Unborn Children from Late-Term Abortions Act. Graham had previously introduced the Pain-Capable Unborn Child Protection Act, which set the period at 20 weeks.

Penalties by state
Currently, 13 states have criminal penalties for performing abortions, regardless of gestational age. The penalties in states that have made abortion illegal vary, as outlined below.

This chart lists only the penalties authorized specifically by the state laws which explicitly restrict (or ban) abortions.  The chart does not address the risk of being prosecuted for violating any other law because of the abortion. The jurisprudence surrounding this question - whether laws such as "fetal-personhood laws", or laws originally intended to protect pregnant women and their pregnancies from external aggressors, can now also be used to prosecute women who obtain abortions, or who terminate their own pregnancies, deliberately or unintentionally - is unsettled, variable, and, in some states, unclear.
States with criminal penalties that are blocked by a court, have yet to take effect, or are unenforced are denoted by a grey background.

State-by-state legal status

Prior to 2022 abortion was legal in all U.S. states, and every state had at least one abortion clinic.  Abortion is a controversial political issue, and regular attempts to restrict it occur in most states. Two such cases, originating in Texas and Louisiana, led to the Supreme Court cases of Whole Woman's Health v. Hellerstedt (2016) and June Medical Services, LLC v. Russo (2020) in which several Texas and Louisiana restrictions were struck down.

The issue of minors and abortion is regulated at the state level, and 37 states require some parental involvement, either in the form of parental consent or in the form of parental notification. In certain situations, the parental restrictions can be overridden by a court. Mandatory waiting periods, mandatory ultrasounds and scripted counseling are common abortion regulations. Abortion laws are generally stricter in conservative Southern states than they are in other parts of the country.

In 2019, New York passed the Reproductive Health Act (RHA), which repealed a pre-Roe provision that banned third-trimester abortions except in cases where the continuation of the pregnancy endangered a pregnant woman's life.

Abortion in the Northern Mariana Islands, a United States Commonwealth territory, is illegal.

Alabama House Republicans passed a law on April 30, 2019, that will criminalize most abortion if it goes into effect. Dubbed the "Human Life Protection Act", it offers only two exceptions: serious health risk to the mother or a lethal fetal anomaly. Amendments that would have added cases of rape or incest to the list of exceptions were rejected It will also make the procedure a Class A felony. Twenty-five male Alabama senators voted to pass the law on May 13. The next day, Alabama governor Kay Ivey signed the bill into law, primarily as a symbolic gesture in hopes of challenging Roe v. Wade in the Supreme Court.

Since Alabama introduced the first modern anti-abortion legislation in April 2019, five other states have also adopted abortion laws including Mississippi, Kentucky, Ohio, Georgia and most recently Louisiana on May 30, 2019.

In May 2019, the U.S. Supreme Court upheld an Indiana state law that requires fetuses which were aborted be buried or cremated. In a December 2019 case, the court declined to review a lower court decision which upheld a Kentucky law requiring doctors to perform ultrasounds and show fetal images to patients before abortions.

On June 29, 2020, previous Supreme Court rulings banning abortion restrictions appeared to be upheld when the U.S. Supreme Court struck down the Louisiana anti-abortion law. Following the ruling, the legality of laws restricting abortion in states such as Ohio was then called into question. It was also noted that Supreme Court Chief Justice John Roberts, who agreed that the Louisiana anti-abortion law was unconstitutional, had previously voted to uphold a similar law in Texas which was struck down by the U.S. Supreme Court in 2016.

In May 2021, Texas lawmakers passed the Texas Heartbeat Act, banning abortions as soon as cardiac activity can be detected, typically as early as six weeks into pregnancy, and often before women know they are pregnant due to the length of the menstrual cycle (which usually lasts a median of four weeks and in some cases can be irregular). In order to avoid traditional constitutional challenges based on Roe v. Wade, the law provides that any person, with or without any vested interest, may sue anyone that performs or induces an abortion in violation of the statute, as well as anyone who "aids or abets the performance or inducement of an abortion, including paying for or reimbursing the costs of an abortion through insurance or otherwise." The law was challenged in courts, though had yet to have a full formal hearing as its September 1, 2021, enactment date came due. Plaintiffs sought an order from the U.S. Supreme Court to stop the law from coming into effect, but the Court issued a denial of the order late on September 1, 2021, allowing the law to remain in effect. While unsigned, Chief Justice John Roberts and Justice Stephen Breyer wrote dissenting opinions joined by Justices Elena Kagan and Sonia Sotomayor that they would have granted an injunction on the law until a proper judicial review.

On September 9, 2021, Merrick Garland, the Attorney General and head of the United States Department of Justice, sued Texas over the Texas Heartbeat Act on the basis that "the law is invalid under the Supremacy Clause and the Fourteenth Amendment to the United States Constitution, is preempted by federal law, and violates the doctrine of intergovernmental immunity". Garland further noted that the United States government has "an obligation to ensure that no state can deprive individuals of their constitutional rights." The Complaint avers that Texas enacted the law "in open defiance of the Constitution". The relief requested from the U.S. District Court in Austin, Texas includes a declaration that the Texas Act is unconstitutional, and an injunction against state actors as well as any and all private individuals who may bring a SB 8 action. The idea of asking a federal court to impose an injunction upon the entire civilian population of a state is unprecedented and has drawn eyebrows.

Colorado passed into law its Reproductive Health Equity Act in April 2022, which assures abortion rights for all citizens of the state. While the bill as passed maintained the status quo for abortion rights, it assures that "every individual has a fundamental right to make decisions about the individual's reproductive health care, including the fundamental right to use or refuse contraception; a pregnant individual has a fundamental right to continue a pregnancy and give birth or to have an abortion and to make decisions about how to exercise that right; and a fertilized egg, embryo, or fetus does not have independent or derivative rights under the laws of the state" regardless of changes that may happen at the federal level.

On May 25, 2022, Oklahoma imposed a ban on elective abortions after Oklahoma Governor Kevin Stitt signed House Bill 4327. The bill bans elective abortion beginning at conception. The law also permits private citizens to file lawsuits against abortion providers who knowingly provide, perform, or induce elective abortions on a pregnant woman. Abortion in cases of rape, incest, or high-risk pregnancies continue to be permitted. A lawsuit was immediately filed by the ACLU in opposition to the bill. At the time of enactment, Oklahoma was the only U.S. state to have passed a bill imposing such restrictions; the law made Oklahoma the first U.S. state to ban elective abortion procedures since prior to the ruling and implementation of Roe in 1973.

After the Supreme Court overturned Roe on June 24, 2022, Texas and Missouri immediately banned abortions with the exception only if the pregnancy was deemed to be particularly life-threatening.

On January 28th, 2023, the Minnesota state Senate passed a bill guaranteeing women's rights to abortion and other reproductive medicine which was signed into law on January 31st. The bill prohibits state and local governments from attempting to restrict access to sterilization or prenatal care, while also requiring contraceptive cost compensation.

In 2023, five women launched a class action lawsuit against the State of Texas after they were reportedly denied abortions at a clinic in the State despite grave risks to their life. Four of the women traveled out of state in order to obtain an abortion, while the fifth only received the abortion in Texas when she was hospitalized after the fetus suffered a premature rupture of membranes. The case argues that the Texas law, which allows abortion if there is a health risk to the mother, is too vague and doctors will not perform an abortion for fear of legal repercussions.

In response to the coronavirus pandemic

Amid the COVID-19 pandemic, anti-abortion government officials in several American states enacted or attempted to enact restrictions on abortion, characterizing it as a non-essential procedure that can be suspended during the medical emergency. The orders have led to several legal challenges and criticism by human rights groups and several national medical organizations, including the American Medical Association. Legal challenges on behalf of abortion providers, many of which were represented by the American Civil Liberties Union and Planned Parenthood, successfully stopped most of the orders on a temporary basis.

One challenge was made against the FDA's rule on the distribution of mifepristone (RU-486), one of the two-part drug regimen to induce abortions. Since 2000, it is only available through health providers under the FDA's ruling. Due to the COVID-19 pandemic, access to mifepristone was a concern, and the American College of Obstetricians and Gynecologists along with other groups sued to have the rule relaxed to allow women to be able to access mifepristone at home through mail-order or retail pharmacies. While the Fourth Circuit issued a preliminary injunction against the FDA's ruling that would have allowed wider distribution, the Supreme Court ordered in a 6–3 decision in January 2021 to put a stay on the injunction, maintaining the FDA's rule.

Sanctuary cities
Since 2019, the anti-abortion movement in the United States has sought declarations of "sanctuary cit[ies] for the unborn". In June 2019, the city council of Waskom, Texas, voted to outlaw abortion in the city, declaring Waskom a "sanctuary city for the unborn" (the first such city to designate itself as such), as state governments elsewhere in the United States were also drafting abortion bans. , there is no abortion clinic in the city. The Waskom ordinance has led other small cities in Texas, and as of April 2021 in Nebraska, to vote in favor of becoming "sanctuary cities for the unborn".

On April 6, 2021, Hayes Center, Nebraska, became the first city in Nebraska to outlaw abortion by local ordinance, declaring itself a "sanctuary city for the unborn." The city of Blue Hill, Nebraska, followed suit and enacted a similar ordinance outlawing abortion on April 13, 2021. In May 2021, Lubbock, Texas, with a population of less than 270,000, voted to ban abortion with the "sanctuary city for the unborn ordinance", becoming the largest city in the U.S to ban abortion.

Abortion rights movements have also pushed for similar counterpart legislation in other cities. In February 2017, the St. Louis Board of Aldermen passed 17-10 Board Bill 203. The bill, sponsored by alderwoman Megan Green, made it illegal for landlords and employers to discriminate against individuals who are pregnant, use contraceptives, and are having or have had abortions. This law was subsequently challenged, with plaintiffs including the St. Louis Archdiocese along with private citizens filing a lawsuit against the city in Our Lady's Inn et al v. City of St Louis on May 22, 2017, In the US District Court of Eastern Missouri, resulting in the ordinance being enjoined against the city.

Abortion medication by mail 
On December 16, 2021, the FDA approved access to abortion pills by mail, permanently lifting the in-person requirement to obtain mifepristone. In states where abortion is banned or restricted, women are able to obtain pills through ordering from overseas online pharmacies, purchasing from pharmacies in Mexico, from services such as Aid Access, or through a network of U.S.-Mexico border organizations that includes Red Necesito Abortar, Las Libres, and Marea Verde.

In January 2023, the U.S. Department of Justice stated that USPS mailing of pills for medication abortion, even into states where abortion services are restricted, does not violate federal law.

Abortion financing

The abortion debate has also been extended to the question of who pays the medical costs of the procedure, with some states using the mechanism as a way of reducing the number of abortions. The cost of an abortion varies depending on factors such as location, facility, timing, and type of procedure. In 2005, a non-hospital abortion at 10 weeks' gestation ranged from $90 to $1,800 (average: $430), whereas an abortion at 20 weeks' gestation ranged from $350 to $4,520 (average: $1,260). Costs are higher for a medical abortion than a first-trimester surgical abortion. A variety of resources from support organizations are available to contribute to the costs of the procedure, as well as travel expenses.

Abortion fund organizations
A variety of organizations offer financial support for people seeking abortions, including travel and other expenses. Access Reproductive Care–Southeast (ARC Southeast), the Brigid Alliance, the Midwest Access Coalition (MAC), and the National Network of Abortion Funds are examples of such groups.

Medicaid
The Hyde Amendment is a federal legislative provision barring the use of federal Medicaid funds to pay for abortions except for rape and incest. The provision, in various forms, was in response to Roe v. Wade, and has been routinely attached to annual appropriations bills since 1976, and represented the first major legislative success by the pro-life movement. The law requires that states cover abortions under Medicaid in the event of rape, incest, and life endangerment.

Private insurance
 5 states (ID, KY, MO, ND, OK) restrict insurance coverage of abortion services in private plans: OK limits coverage to life endangerment, rape or incest circumstances; and the other four states limit coverage to cases of life endangerment.
 11 states (CO, KY, MA, MS, NE, ND, OH, PA, RI, SC, VA) restrict abortion coverage in insurance plans for public employees, with CO and KY restricting insurance coverage of abortion under any circumstances.
 U.S. laws also ban federal funding of abortions for federal employees and their dependents, Native Americans covered by the Indian Health Service, military personnel and their dependents, and women with disabilities covered by Medicare.

Mexico City policy

Under this policy, U.S. federal funding to NGOs that provide abortion is not permitted. The policy was first announced by President Ronald Reagan in 1984. It has been rescinded by Democratic presidents and reinstated by Republican presidents. The policy was rescinded in 2021 by President Joe Biden.

Qualifying requirements for abortion providers
Qualifying requirements for performing abortions vary from state to state.  Vermont has allowed physician assistants to do some first-trimester abortions since the mid-1970s.  More recently, several states have changed their requirements for abortion providers, anticipating that the Supreme Court would overturn Roe v. Wade; now that the court has done so, more states are expanding eligibility to provide abortions. , California, Connecticut, Delaware, Hawaii, Illinois, Maine, Maryland, Massachusetts, Montana, New Jersey, New York, Rhode Island, Virginia and Washington allow mid-level practitioners such as nurse practitioners, nurse midwives, and physicians assistants, to do some first-trimester abortions.  In other states, non-physicians are not permitted to perform abortions.

Statistics

Because reporting of abortions is not mandatory, statistics are of varying reliability. Both the Centers For Disease Control (CDC) and the Guttmacher Institute regularly compile these statistics.

Number of abortions
The annual number of legal induced abortions in the U.S. doubled between 1973 and 1979, and peaked in 1990. There was a slow but steady decline throughout the 1990s. Overall, the number of annual abortions decreased by 6% between 2000 and 2009, with temporary spikes in 2002 and 2006.

By 2011, abortion rate in the nation dropped to its lowest point since the Supreme Court legalized the procedure. According to a study performed by Guttmacher Institute, long-acting contraceptive methods had a significant impact in reducing unwanted pregnancies. There were fewer than 17 abortions for every 1,000 women of child-bearing age. That was a 13%-decrease from 2008's numbers and slightly higher than the rate in 1973, when the Supreme Court's Roe v. Wade decision legalized abortion. The study indicated a long-term decline in the abortion rate.

In 2016, the Centers for Disease Control and Prevention (CDC) reported 623,471 abortions, a 2% decrease from 636,902 in 2015.

Medical abortions
A Guttmacher Institute survey of abortion providers estimated that early medical abortions accounted for 17% of all non-hospital abortions and slightly over one-quarter of abortions before 9 weeks gestation in the United States in 2008. Medical abortions voluntarily reported to the CDC by 34 reporting areas (excluding Alabama, California, Connecticut, Delaware, Florida, Hawaii, Illinois, Louisiana, Maryland, Massachusetts, Nebraska, Nevada, New Hampshire, Pennsylvania, Tennessee, Vermont, Wisconsin, and Wyoming) and published in its annual abortion surveillance reports have increased every year since the September 28, 2000 FDA approval of mifepristone (RU-486): 1.0% in 2000, 2.9% in 2001, 5.2% in 2002, 7.9% in 2003, 9.3% in 2004, 9.9% in 2005, 10.6% in 2006, 13.1% in 2007, 15.8% in 2008, 17.1% in 2009 (25.2% of those at less than 9 weeks gestation). Medical abortions accounted for 32% of first-trimester abortions at Planned Parenthood clinics in 2008. By 2020, medication abortions accounted for more than 50% of all abortions.

Abortion and religion
A majority of abortions are obtained by religiously identified women. According to the Guttmacher Institute, "more than 7 in 10 U.S. women obtaining an abortion report a religious affiliation (37% protestant, 28% Catholic, and 7% other), and 25% attend religious services at least once a month. The abortion rate for protestant women is 15 per 1,000 women, while Catholic women have a slightly higher rate, 20 per 1,000."

Abortions and ethnicity
Abortion rates tend to be higher among minority women in the U.S. In 2000–2001, the rates among black and Hispanic women were 49 per 1,000 and 33 per 1,000, respectively, vs. 13 per 1,000 among non-Hispanic white women. Note that this figure includes all women of reproductive age, including women that are not pregnant. In other words, these abortion rates reflect the rate at which U.S. women of reproductive age have an abortion each year.

In 2004, the rates of abortion by ethnicity in the U.S. were 50 abortions per 1,000 black women, 28 abortions per 1,000 Hispanic women, and 11 abortions per 1,000 white women.

In-state vs. out-of-state 

Roe v. Wade legalized abortion nationwide in 1973.  In 1972, 41% of abortions were performed on women outside their state of residence, while in 1973 it declined to 21%, and then to 11% in 1974.

In the decade from 2011 to 2020, during which many states increased abortion restrictions, the percentage of women nationwide who traveled out of state for an abortion increased steadily, from 6% in 2011 to 9% in 2020. Out of state travel for an abortion was much more prevalent in the 29 states hostile to abortion rights, with percentages in those states rising from 9% in 2011 to 15% by 2020, while in states supportive of abortion rights, out of state travel for abortions rose from 2% to 3% between 2011 and 2020.

Gutttmacher has released data about abortions by state of occurrence and state of residence. In some states, these numbers can be tremendously different, for example in Missouri, a state very hostile to abortion rights, the abortion rate by state of occurrence dropped from 4 in 1000 women aged 15–44 for 2017 to 0.1 for 2020, because 57% of abortion recipients went out of state in 2017, while 99% did so in 2020. In contrast, from 2017 to 2020, the abortion rate by state of residence for Missourians went up by 18% from 8.4 to 9.9.

Some out of state travel pertains to locations of population centers in states; if large cities are close to state borders it may be common to cross borders for an abortion.  For example, Delaware, which is generally supportive of abortion rights, saw 44% of residents obtain their abortions in neighboring states.

Motherhood 
In 2019, 60% of women who had abortions were already mothers, and 50% already had two or more children.

Reasons for abortions

A 1998 study revealed that in 1987 to 1988, women reported the following as their primary reasons for choosing an abortion:

The source of this information takes findings into account from 27 nations including the United States, and therefore, these findings may not be typical for any one nation.

According to a 1987 study that included specific data about late abortions (i. e., abortions "at 16 or more weeks' gestation"), women reported that various reasons contributed to their having a late abortion:

In 2000, cases of rape or incest accounted for 1% of abortions.

A 2004 study by the Guttmacher Institute reported that women listed the following amongst their reasons for choosing to have an abortion:

A 2008 National Survey of Family Growth (NSFG) shows that rates of unintended pregnancy are highest among Blacks, Hispanics, and women with lower socio-economic status.
 70% of all pregnancies among Black women were unintended
 57% of all pregnancies among Hispanic women were unintended
 42% of all pregnancies among White women were unintended

When women have abortions (by gestational age)

According to the Centers for Disease Control, in 2011, most (64.5%) abortions were performed by ≤8 weeks' gestation, and nearly all (91.4%) were performed by ≤13 weeks' gestation. Few abortions (7.3%) were performed between 14 and 20 weeks' gestation or at ≥21 weeks' gestation (1.4%). From 2002 to 2011, the percentage of all abortions performed at ≤8 weeks' gestation increased 6%.

Safety of abortions

The risk of death from carrying a child to term in the U.S. is approximately 14 times greater than the risk of death from a legal abortion.  The risk of abortion-related mortality increases with gestational age, but remains lower than that of childbirth through at least 21 weeks' gestation.

Birth control effects

Increased access to birth control has been statistically linked to reductions in the abortion rate. As an element of family planning, birth control was federally subsidized for low income families in 1965 under President Lyndon B. Johnson's War on Poverty program. In 1970, Congress passed Title X to provide family planning services for those in need, and President Richard Nixon signed it into law. Funding for Title X rose from $6 million in 1971 to $61 million the next year, and slowly increased each year to $317 million in 2010, after which it was reduced by a few percent.

In 2011, the Guttmacher Institute reported that the number of abortions in the U.S. would be nearly two-thirds higher without access to birth control. In 2015, the Federation of American Scientists reported that federally mandated access to birth control had helped reduce teenage pregnancies in the U.S. by 44 percent, and had prevented more than 188,000 unintended pregnancies.

Public opinion

Americans have been equally divided on the issue; a May 2018 Gallup poll indicated that 48% of Americans described themselves as "pro-choice" and 48% described themselves as "pro-life". A July 2018 poll indicated that 64% of Americans did not want the Supreme Court to overturn Roe v. Wade, while 28% did. The same poll found that support for abortion being generally legal was 60% during the first trimester, dropping to 28% in the second trimester, and 13% in the third trimester.

Support for the legalization of abortion has been consistently higher among more educated adults than less educated, and in 2019, 70% of college graduates support abortion being legal in all or most cases, compared to 60% of those with some college, and 54% of those with a high school degree or less.

In January 2013, a majority of Americans believed abortion should be legal in all or most cases, according to a poll by NBC News and The Wall Street Journal. Approximately 70% of respondents in the same poll opposed Roe v. Wade being overturned. A poll by the Pew Research Center yielded similar results. Moreover, 48% of Republicans opposed overturning Roe, compared to 46% who supported overturning it.

Gallup declared in May 2010 that more Americans identifying as "pro-life" is "the new normal", while also noting that there had been no increase in opposition to abortion. It suggested that political polarization may have prompted more Republicans to call themselves "pro-life". The terms "pro-choice" and "pro-life" do not always reflect a political view or fall along a binary; in one Public Religion Research Institute poll, seven in ten Americans described themselves as "pro-choice" while almost two-thirds described themselves as "pro-life". The same poll found that 56% of Americans were in favor of legal access to abortion in all or some cases.

A 2022 study reviewing the literature and public opinion datasets found that 43.8% of survey respondents in the U.S. consistently support both elective and traumatic abortion, whereas only 14.8% consistently oppose abortion irrespective of the reason, and others differ in their degree of support for abortion depending on the circumstances of the abortion. 90% approve of abortion when the health of the woman is endangered, 77.4% when there is a strong chance of defects in the baby that could result from the pregnancy, and 79.5% when the pregnancy is the result of rape.

A January 2023 Gallup poll found that nearly 7 in 10 Americans disapprove of the country's abortion policies, the highest rate in 23 years.

By gender and age 

Pew Research Center polling shows little change in views from 2008 to 2012; modest differences based on gender or age.

The original article's table also shows by party affiliation, religion, and education level.

By educational level 
Support for the legalization of abortion is significantly higher among more educated adults than less educated, and has been consistently so for decades. In 2019, 70% of college graduates support abortion being legal in all or most cases, as well as 60% of those with some college education, compared to 54% of those with a high school degree or less.

By gender, party, and region 
A January 2003 CBS News/The New York Times poll examined whether Americans thought abortion should be legal or not, and found variations in opinion which depended upon party affiliation and the region of the country. The margin of error is +/– 4% for questions answered of the entire sample (overall figures) and may be higher for questions asked of subgroups (all other figures).

By trimester of pregnancy

A CNN/USA Today/Gallup poll in January 2003 asked about the legality of abortion by trimester, using the question, "Do you think abortion should generally be legal or generally illegal during each of the following stages of pregnancy?" This same question was also asked by Gallup in March 2000 and July 1996. Polls indicates general support of legal abortion during the first trimester, although support drops dramatically for abortion during the second and third trimester.

Since the 2011 poll, support for legal abortion during the first trimester has declined.

By circumstance or reasons
According to Gallup's long-time polling on abortion, the majority of Americans are neither strictly "pro-life" or "pro-choice"; it depends upon the circumstances of the pregnancy. Gallup polling from 1996 to 2021 consistently reveals that when asked the question, "Do you think abortions should be legal under any circumstances, legal only under certain circumstances, or illegal in all circumstances?", Americans repeatedly answer "legal only under certain circumstances". According to the poll, in any given year 48–57% say legal only under certain circumstances, 21–34% say legal under any circumstances, and 13–19% illegal in all circumstances, with 1–7% having no opinion.

According to the aforementioned poll, Americans differ drastically based upon situation of the pregnancy, suggesting they do not support unconditional abortions. Based on two separate polls taken May 19–21, 2003, of 505 and 509 respondents respectively, Americans stated their approval for abortion under these various circumstances:

Another separate trio of polls taken by Gallup in 2003, 2000, and 1996, revealed public support for abortion as follows for the given criteria:

Gallup furthermore established public support for many issues supported by the anti-abortion community and opposed by the abortion rights community:

An October 2007 CBS News poll explored under what circumstances Americans believe abortion should be allowed, asking the question, "What is your personal feeling about abortion?" The results were as follows:

Additional polls

 A June 2000 Los Angeles Times survey found that, although 57% of polltakers considered abortion to be murder, half of that 57% believed in allowing women access to abortion. The survey also found that, overall, 65% of respondents did not believe abortion should be legal after the first trimester, including 72% of women and 58% of men. Further, the survey found that 85% of Americans polled supported abortion in cases of risk to a woman's physical health, 54% if the woman's mental health was at risk, and 66% if a congenital abnormality was detected in the fetus.
 A July 2002 Public Agenda poll found that 44% of men and 42% of women thought that "abortion should be generally available to those who want it", 34% of men and 35% of women thought that "abortion should be available, but under stricter than limits it is now", and 21% of men and 22% of women thought that "abortion should not be permitted".
 A January 2003 ABC News/The Washington Post poll also examined attitudes towards abortion by gender. In answer to the question, "On the subject of abortion, do you think abortion should be legal in all cases, legal in most cases, illegal in most cases or illegal in all cases?", 25% of women responded that it should be legal in "all cases", 33% that it should be legal in "most cases", 23% that it should be illegal in "most cases", and 17% that it should be illegal in "all cases". 20% of men thought it should be legal in "all cases", 34% legal in "most cases", 27% illegal in "most cases", and 17% illegal in "all cases".
 Most Fox News viewers favor both parental notification as well as parental consent, when a minor seeks an abortion. A Fox News poll in 2005 found that 78% of people favor a notification requirement, and 72% favor a consent requirement.
 An April 2006 Harris poll on Roe v. Wade, asked, "In 1973, the U.S. Supreme Court decided that states' laws which made it illegal for a woman to have an abortion up to three months of pregnancy were unconstitutional, and that the decision on whether a woman should have an abortion up to three months of pregnancy should be left to the woman and her doctor to decide. In general, do you favor or oppose this part of the U.S. Supreme Court decision making abortions up to three months of pregnancy legal?", to which 49% of respondents indicated favor while 47% indicated opposition. The Harris organization has concluded from this poll that, "49 percent now support Roe vs. Wade".
 Two polls were released in May 2007 asking Americans "With respect to the abortion issue, would you consider yourself to be pro-choice or pro-life?" May 4–6, a CNN poll found 45% said "pro-choice" and 50% said pro-life. Within the following week, a Gallup poll found 50% responding "pro-choice" and 44% pro-life.
 In 2011, a poll conducted by the Public Religion Research Institute found that 43% of respondents identified themselves as both "pro-life" and "pro-choice".

Intact dilation and extraction

In 2003, the U.S. Congress outlawed intact dilation and extraction when it passed the Partial-Birth Abortion Ban Act. A Rasmussen Reports poll four days after the Supreme Court's opinion in Gonzales v. Carhart found that 40% of respondents "knew the ruling allowed states to place some restrictions on specific abortion procedures." Of those who knew of the decision, 56% agreed with the decision and 32% were opposed. An ABC poll from 2003 found that 62% of respondents thought "partial-birth abortion" should be illegal; a similar number of respondents wanted an exception "if it would prevent a serious threat to the woman's health".

Gallup has repeatedly queried the American public on this issue.

Positions of political parties
After Roe, there was a national political realignment surrounding abortion. The abortion-rights movement in the United States initially emphasized the national policy benefits of abortion, such as smaller welfare expenses, slower population growth, and fewer illegitimate births. The abortion-rights movement drew support from the population control movement, feminists, and environmentalists. Anti-abortion advocates and civil-rights activists accused abortion-rights supporters of intending to control the population of racial minorities and the disabled, citing their ties to racial segregationists and eugenicist legal reformers. The abortion-rights movement subsequently distanced from the population control movement, and responded by taking up choice-based and rights-oriented rhetoric similar to what was used in the Roe decision. Opponents of abortion experienced a political shift. The Catholic Church and the Democratic Party supported an expansive welfare state, wanted to reduce rates of abortion through prenatal insurance and federally funded day care, and opposed abortion at the time of Roe. Afterwards, the anti-abortion movement in the United States shifted more to Protestant faiths that saw abortion rights as part of a liberal-heavy agenda to fight against, and became part of the new Christian right. The Protestant influence helped make opposition to abortion part of the Republican Party's platform by the 1990s. Republican-led states enacted laws to restrict abortion, including abortions earlier than Caseys general standard of 24 weeks.

Into the 21st century, although members of both major U.S. political parties come down on either side of the issue, the Republican Party is often seen as being anti-abortion, since the official party platform opposes abortion and considers fetuses to have an inherent right to life. Republicans for Choice represents the minority of that party. In 2006, pollsters found that 9% of Republicans favor the availability of abortion in most circumstances. Of Republican National Convention delegates in 2004, 13% believed that abortion should be generally available, and 38% believed that it should not be permitted. The same poll showed that 17% of all Republican voters believed that abortion should be generally available to those who want it, while 38% believed that it should not be permitted. The Republican Party was supportive of abortion rights prior to 1976 Republican National Convention, at which they supported an anti-abortion constitutional amendment as a temporary political ploy to gain more support from Catholics; this stance brought many more social conservatives into the party resulting in a large and permanent shift toward support of the anti-abortion position. The Democratic Party platform considers abortion to be a woman's right. Democrats for Life of America represents the minority of that party. In 2006, pollsters found that 74% of Democrats favor the availability of abortion in most circumstances. Of Democratic National Convention delegates in 2004, 75% believed that abortion should be generally available, and 2% believed that abortion should not be permitted. The same poll showed that 49% of all Democratic voters believed that abortion should be generally available to those who want it, while 13% believed that it should not be permitted.

The position of U.S. third political parties and other U.S. minor political parties is diverse. The Green Party supports legal abortion as a woman's right. While abortion is a contentious issue and the Maryland-based Libertarians for Life opposes the legality of abortion in most circumstances, the Libertarian Party platform (2012) states that "government should be kept out of the matter, leaving the question to each person for their conscientious consideration." The issue of abortion has become deeply politicized. In 2002, 84% of state Democratic platforms supported the right to having an abortion while 88% of state Republican platforms opposed it. This divergence also led to Christian right organizations like Christian Voice, Christian Coalition of America, and Moral Majority having an increasingly strong role in the Republican Party. This opposition has been extended under the Foreign Assistance Act; in 1973, Jesse Helms introduced an amendment banning the use of aid money to promote abortion overseas, and in 1984 the Mexico City policy prohibited financial support to any overseas organization that performed or promoted abortions. The policy was revoked by President Bill Clinton and subsequently reinstated by President George W. Bush. President Barack Obama overruled this policy by Executive Order on January 23, 2009, and it was reinstated on January 23, 2017, by President Donald Trump. On January 28, 2021, President Joe Biden signed a Presidential Memorandum that repealed the restoration of Mexico City policy and also called for the United States Department of Health and Human Services to "suspend, rescind or revoke" restrictions made to Title X.

Effects of legalization and impact of abortion bans

The risk of death due to legal abortion has fallen considerably since Roe v. Wade (1973) legalized it; this was due to increased physician skills, improved medical technology, and earlier termination of pregnancy. From 1940 through 1970, deaths of pregnant women during abortion fell from nearly 1,500 to a little over 100. According to the Centers for Disease Control and Prevention, the number of women who died in 1972 from illegal abortion was thirty-nine. The Roe effect is a hypothesis suggesting that since supporters of abortion rights cause the erosion of their own political base by having fewer children, the practice of abortion will eventually lead to the restriction or illegalization of abortion. The legalized abortion and crime effect is another controversial theory that posits legal abortion reduces crime because unwanted children are more likely to become criminals.

Since Roe, there have been numerous attempts to reverse the decision. In the 2011 election season, Mississippi placed an amendment on the ballot that redefined how the state viewed abortion. The personhood amendment defined personhood as "every human being from the moment of fertilization, cloning or the functional equivalent thereof"; if passed, it would have been illegal to get an abortion in the state. On July 11, 2012, a Mississippi federal judge ordered an extension of his temporary order to allow the state's only abortion clinic to stay open. The order was to stay in place until U.S. District Judge Daniel Porter Jordan III could review newly drafted rules on how the Mississippi Department of Health would administer a new abortion law. The law in question came into effect on July 1, 2012.

Between 2008 and 2016, the Turnaway Study followed a group of 1,000 women, two of whom died after giving birth, for five years after they sought an abortion, and compared their health and socio-economic consequences of receiving an abortion or being denied one. The study found that those who were provided with abortion performed better, and those who were denied one suffered negative consequences. Scientific American described it as landmark. A follow-up Turnaway Study was confirmed to determinate the health and economic impact of Roe being overturned, which other scholars also analyzed. According to a 2019 study, were Roe reversed and abortion bans implemented in states with trigger laws, including states considered highly likely to ban abortion, "increases in travel distance are estimated to prevent 93,546 to 143,561 women from accessing abortion care."

For the Dobbs v. Jackson Women's Health Organization case, which confirmed the May 2022 leaks obtained by Politico and overruled Roe and Planned Parenthood v. Casey in June 2022, among the over 130 amici curiae briefs, hundreds of scientists provided evidence, data, and studies, in particular the Turnaway Study, in favor of abortion rights and to rebuke arguments made to the Court that abortion "has no beneficial effect on women's lives and careers—and might even cause them harm". The American Historical Association (AHA) and the Organization of American Historians (OAH) were among those who signed an amici curiae brief for Dobbs, and were cited, among others, by Reason, Syracuse University News, and The Washington Post. AHA and OAH jointly issued a statement against the Supreme Court's decision, which was reported by Anchorage Daily News, Inside Higher Ed, Insight Into Diversity, and the Strict Scrutiny podcast from Crooked Media, saying they have "declined to take seriously the historical claims of our [amicus curiae] brief". Joined by at least 30 other academic and scholarly institutions, they condemned "the court's misinterpretation about the history of legalized abortion" and said it has "the potential to exacerbate historic injustices and deepen inequalities in our country".

Unintended live birth
Although it is uncommon, women sometimes give birth in spite of an attempted abortion. Reporting of live birth after attempted abortion may not be consistent from state to state, but 38 were recorded in one study in upstate New York in the two-and-a-half years before Roe v. Wade. Under the Born-Alive Infants Protection Act of 2002, medical staff must report live birth if they observe any breathing, heartbeat, umbilical cord pulsation, or confirmed voluntary muscle movement, regardless of whether the born-alive is non-viable ex utero in the long term because of birth defects, and regardless of gestational age, including gestational ages which are too early for long-term viability ex utero.

See also

 Abortion law
 Abortion law in the United States by state
 Abortion and the Catholic Church in the United States
 Anti-abortion violence in the United States
 Feminism in the United States
 Heartbeat bill 
 Religion and abortion
 Reproductive rights
 Types of abortion restrictions in the United States
 War on women

Notable cases
 Becky Bell, an American teenage girl who died as a result of an unsafe abortion in 1988.
 Rosie Jimenez, an American woman who was the first recorded death due to an unsafe abortion after federal Medicaid funds for abortions were removed by the Hyde Amendment in 1977.
 Gerri Santoro, an American woman who died because of an unsafe abortion in 1964.
 Gerardo Flores, convicted in 2005 on two counts of capital murder for giving his girlfriend, who was carrying twins, an at-home abortion.
 Gianna Jessen, an American woman who was born alive in 1977 after an attempted saline abortion.
 Sherri Chessen, an actress who had difficulty seeking an abortion for her thalidomide-deformed baby in 1962.

Notes

References

Further reading

External links

 The Future of Abortions in America: An access map. (New York Magazine, 2022)
 Find an Abortion Clinic (New York Magazine, 2022)
 A Primer on Where to Find the Abortion Pill (New York Magazine, 2022)
 National Network of Abortion Funds 
 Abortion pill access
 Full text of Roe v. Wade decision
 Abortion: Judicial History and Legislative Response by Jon O. Shimabukuro, Congressional Research Service, February 25, 2022
 Interactive maps comparing U.S. abortion restrictions by state
 Number of Abortions – Abortion Counters
 For Many Women, The Nearest Abortion Provider Is Hundreds Of Miles Away (2017) – includes map showing distance to nearest abortion clinic

 
Human rights in the United States
Law of the United States
Reproductive rights in the United States